Haravgi ( / "Dawn") is a Greek language newspaper published in Cyprus since 1956. It is one of the largest newspapers on the island and is affiliated to AKEL, the Progressive Party of Working People. Haravgi reports daily on political developments –both locally and internationally, financial issues, sports, culture, environment, entertainment etc. Its Sunday edition is highly regarded for its reviews on culture and new technologies while its Monday edition is mainly sports oriented. Once a month it includes a youth magazine given at no extra cost.

See also 
 List of newspapers in Cyprus

References

External links
Official website

Publications established in 1956
Greek-language newspapers
Newspapers published in Cyprus